Kibasuka is a ward in Tarime District, Mara Region of northern Tanzania, East Africa. In 2016 the Tanzania National Bureau of Statistics report there were 16,703 people in the ward, from 15,137 in 2012.

Villages / neighborhoods 
The ward has 4 villages and 32 hamlets.

 Nyarwana
 Kemotya
 Kenyarobi
 Mekende
 Mwara
 Nyabokaragati Senta
 Nyabori
 Nyahongo
 Nyansurura
 Nyarwana Senta
 Nyakunguru
 Gwikongo
 Itandura
 Mochongocho
 Nyakunguru Senta
 Nyamanche
 Nyamichale
 Nyamuma
 Nyankorambe Senta
 Seregeta
 Turuturu
 Weigita
 Bonsabi
 Bunchari
 Kemorabu
 Nyairema
 Nyambeche
 Nyanchage
 Senta
 Keisaka
 Bikarabwa
 Gwitende
 Keisaka
 Kubirera
 Songambele

References

Tarime District
Mara Region